Oliver Thomas Hopkins (15 November 1935 – 14 April 2014) was an English footballer who played as a centre half.

Career
In May 1954, Hopkins joined Barnsley from Burtonwood. Although a centre half by trade, Hopkins also played as a striker for the club, scoring a hat-trick in a 3–2 away win against Newport County on 13 March 1954. After making 54 appearances in all competitions for Barnsley, Hopkins signed for Peterborough United in 1961. Hopkins made 104 Football League appearances at Peterborough over the course of four years, before signing for Chelmsford City following recommendations by former Barnsley teammates Peter Gillott and Ron Smillie.

Hopkins made 91 appearances in his first spell at Chelmsford, before signing for Brentwood Town in 1967. In 1970, Hopkins returned to Chelmsford, following a merger between both clubs, in a coaching capacity as well as making three final appearances. In 1974, Hopkins briefly left the club, following Dave Bumpstead's departure as manager. In 1978, Hopkins was appointed manager of Chelmsford, following a two year period managing the club's reserves. In 2010, Hopkins was named president of Chelmsford, after witnessing his son and grandson turn out for the club.

References

1935 births
2014 deaths
Association football defenders
Association football forwards
English footballers
People from South Kirkby
Barnsley F.C. players
Peterborough United F.C. players
Chelmsford City F.C. players
Brentwood Town F.C. players
Chelmsford City F.C. managers
English Football League players
English football managers
Chelmsford City F.C. non-playing staff
Association football coaches